The 2012–13 Texas A&M–Corpus Christi Islanders men's basketball team represented Texas A&M University–Corpus Christi in the 2012–13 NCAA Division I men's basketball season. This was head coach Willis Wilson's second season at Texas A&M–Corpus Christi. The Islanders were members of the Southland Conference and played their home games at the American Bank Center. They finished the season 6–26, 5–13 in Southland play to finish in ninth place. Although, they would not have qualified for the conference tournament, they were on a post season ban for low APR scores.

Media
Texas A&M–Corpus Christi men's basketball airs on KKTX with Steven King on the call all season long. Video streaming of all non-televised home games is available at GoIslanders.com.

Roster

Schedule and Results

|-
!colspan=9 style="background:#0067C5; color:#9EA2A4;"| Exhibition

|-
!colspan=9 style="background:#007F3E; color:#9EA2A4;"| Regular Season

References

Texas A&M–Corpus Christi Islanders men's basketball seasons
Texas AandM-Corpus Christi
Texas AandM-Corpus Christi Islanders basketball
Texas AandM-Corpus Christi Islanders basketball